Calliandra physocalyx is a species of flowering plants of the genus Calliandra in the family Fabaceae, endemic to southwestern Mexico. It is a shrub with pink-and-white or pink-and-red flowers. The species was first scientifically described in 1988.

Distribution
Calliandra physocalyx is known only from a small mountainous area of the Pacific slope of southwestern Mexico, in western Oaxaca and adjacent Guerrero, at   elevation. It has been seen mostly in disturbed habitats that were previously forest.

References

physocalyx
Endemic flora of Mexico
Flora of Guerrero
Flora of Oaxaca
Flora of the Sierra Madre del Sur